Corral Quemado is a locality located in the Colón Department of the province of Córdoba. It is 8 km northwest of La Granja, on which it depends administratively.

References

Populated places in Córdoba Province, Argentina